Joseph or Joe Cross may refer to:

People
 Joseph Cross (actor) (born 1986), American actor
 Joseph Cross (cartographer) (1821–1865), English cartographer
 Joseph Cross (cricketer) (1849–1918), English cricketer
 Joseph Cross (judge) (1843–1913), New Jersey state legislator and judge
 Joseph Cross (trade unionist) (1859–1925), British trade unionist
 Joe Cross (baseball) (1858–1933), Major League Baseball right fielder
 Joe Cross (filmmaker) (born 1966), Australian filmmaker

Other
 Joseph Cross (tower) (German: Josephskreuz), an architecturally significant observation tower

Cross, Joseph